

The Verville-Sperry R-3 Racer was a cantilever wing monoplane with a streamlined fuselage and the second aircraft with fully retractable landing gear, the first being the Dayton-Wright RB-1 Racer. In 1961, the R-3 racer was identified as one of the "Twelve Most Significant Aircraft of all Time" by Popular Mechanics magazine. In 1924, an R-3 won the Pulitzer Trophy in Dayton, OH.

Design and development
The R-3 was designed by Alfred Verville.  Its first production was in 1922. The R-3 was developed by the McCook Field Engineering Division and manufactured by the Lawrence Sperry Aircraft Company of Farmingdale, New York. Three aircraft were purchased.  The airplanes used cylindrical, finned Lamblin radiators and a  Wright H-3 engine. The R-3s bore Air Service serial numbers 22-326 to 22-328.

Operational history

At the 1922 Pulitzer Trophy race, all three R-3's started in the race, but only two finished. Lieutenant Fonda B. Johnson finished seventh, his engine freezing after landing. And Lieutenant St. Clair Streett broke an oil line and had a forced landing, damaging his airplane.

For the 1923 Pulitzer, a Curtiss D-12 engine was installed in the plane which eliminated some vibration problems that the H-3 engine had. With the new engine the top speed now was approaching . That year a Curtiss biplane was the winner.

For the 1924 Pulitzer, the R-3, piloted by Lieutenant Harry H. Mills, won the race at a slow . The ranked entry–a Curtiss biplane–crashed along the course.

After this race, the R-3 racers were sent to the McCook Field Museum.

Operators

United States Army Air Corps

See also

 History of the United States Army Air Service

References

1920s United States military utility aircraft
Racing aircraft
Verville aircraft
Sperry aircraft
Low-wing aircraft
Single-engined tractor aircraft
Aircraft first flown in 1922